Trawalla is a town in central Western Victoria, Australia, located on the Western Highway,  west of Ballarat and  west of Melbourne, in the Shire of Pyrenees.

Trawalla sits at the headwaters of the Mount Emu Creek where it crosses the Western Highway.  The Moner balug clan of the Wathaurong Aboriginal people called the area Trawalla, which means 'wild water' or possibly 'much rain'.

In 1836, the district was traversed and described by explorer Sir Thomas Mitchell after ascending Mount Cole. The first European settlers to arrive in the area were squatters, Kenneth William Kirkland, his wife Katherine (née Hamilton), their daughter Agnes Anna, and Katherine's brothers Robert and James McGregor Hamilton, and they established sheep and cattle grazing runs. Trawalla Station, was established by Hamilton in 1838 and acquired by Adolphus Goldsmith three years later. After passing through several owners, the property was taken over by Rear Admiral Bridges in 1887. It was under his ownership that Trawalla House was constructed.

Trawalla Post Office opened on 3 December 1864 at the time of closer settlement and closed 13 July 1974. The Ararat railway line passes through the town, and Trawalla railway station opened with the line in August 1874. The station was closed on 4 October 1981.

After Bridges' death in 1917, a large part of the Trawalla estate was acquired and subdivided by the Commonwealth Government as part of the soldier settlement scheme. The land was deemed appropriate for grazing and farming.

The Langi Kal Kal pastoral run was subdivided for the same purpose after World War II in 1948. A local primary school, a roadhouse and the minimum-security prison farm HM Prison Langi Kal Kal, are the focal points of the area.

Trawalla is the birthplace of Australia's ninth Prime Minister James Henry Scullin, commonly known as Jim. He was born on 18 September 1876, and was the fifth of the nine children of John Scullin and Ann Logan, both immigrants from Derry, Ireland. His father, John Scullin had been a miner and later a platelayer on the railways. James Scullin attended small state schools, first at Trawalla and later at Mount Rowan near Ballarat. He married Sarah McNamara in 1907, but had no children. He died in Melbourne on 28 January 1953. A memorial cairn is located close to where Scullin lived.

References

External links

Towns in Victoria (Australia)
Australian soldier settlements